Andromache Dimitropoulou (born 12 October 1994), known professionally as Andromache and sometimes Andromachi, is a Greek singer who represented Cyprus in the Eurovision Song Contest 2022 with the song "Ela".

Career 
Andromache was born to Greek parents in Siegen, Germany where she lived before moving to Greece at the age of 10. While studying German philology in Athens, she started singing in music scenes at Lechaina, Elis and Gazi, Athens.

In 2015, she participated in the second season of The Voice of Greece, where she was eliminated at the second live show.

In 2017, she released her first single, titled "" ("The Moon"), written by Giorgos Papadopoulos. On 9 March, it was announced that she would represent Cyprus in the Eurovision Song Contest 2022 with the song "Ela".

Discography

Compilation albums 
 Ela – The Album (2022)

References

Eurovision Song Contest entrants for Cyprus
Eurovision Song Contest entrants of 2022
1994 births
Living people
21st-century Greek women singers
Musicians from Mannheim
Panik Records artists